Tim Hunter may refer to:

 Tim Hunter (astronomer), American radiologist and amateur astronomer
 Tim Hunter (director) (born 1947), American television and film director
 Tim Hunter (ice hockey) (born 1960), Canadian ice hockey player
 Tim Hunter (soccer) (born 1955), Canadian-American soccer player
 Timothy Hunter, a fictional character in the DC Comics miniseries The Books of Magic